Maurice Collins may refer to:

 Maurice Collins (judge), Irish judge
 Maurice Collins (politician) (1878–1945), Australian politician
 Mardy Collins (born 1984), American professional basketball player